Kwon Hae-hyo (born November 6, 1965) is a South Korean television, film and stage actor. He is also an activist, involved in the Unite Our People Movement Headquarters, the Abolish the Family Registry and Create Family Equality Organization, the Cultural Alliance for Peace at Daechuri, the Minkahyup Human Rights Group, among various other political and social justice causes.

Filmography

Film

Television series

Variety show

Hosting

Theater

Awards and nominations

References

External links
 
 
 

1965 births
Living people
South Korean male television actors
South Korean male film actors
South Korean male stage actors
Hanyang University alumni
Male actors from Seoul
20th-century South Korean male actors
21st-century South Korean male actors